Funny Bidness: Da Album is the first comedy album by American actor and comedian Mike Epps, released on October 27, 2009 by E1 Music. The album has appearances by Young Dro, Slim Thug, Too Short, DJ Quik, Flo Rida, Snoop Dogg, Young Jeezy, among others.

The album debuted at #98 on the US Top R&B/Hip-Hop Albums and at #9 on the Top Comedy Albums.

Track listing
"Interview (Skit)" - 0:25 
"Ain't Chu You" - 4:37 (featuring Young Dro, Nitti & Dorrough)
"The Bitch Won't Leave Me Alone" - 4:03
"Trying to Be a Gangsta" - 2:54
"Church Pastor (Skit)" - 0:49
"I Da Pimp" (featuring Slim Thug & Too Short) - 3:39
"No Dial Tone" - 3:38
"Baby Makin' Nigga" - 3:57 (featuring Flo Rida)
"Domestic Dispute" - 6:03 (featuring Snoop Dogg)
"Young Prison Program (Skit)" - 0:55 
"Burn Hollywood" - 4:07
"If I Left It at Home" - 4:12 (featuring Tyler Woods)
"Big Girls" - 3:29 
"Jail Call (Skit)" - 2:39
"Extra Gangsta" - 4:02
"I Love The Hoes" (featuring DJ Quik) - 2:54
"Gone Back to Indiana" - 4:29

Charts

References

2009 debut albums
E1 Music albums
Albums produced by DJ Quik
Albums produced by Scott Storch